The World Indoor Archery Championships, an international competition in archery,  have been held in alternate years since 1991 (except for a three-year gap 2009–2012), each time in a different host city. There are events in adult and junior categories using the recurve and compound bows.

Indoor

Host cities

Champions

Recurve

Compound

Recurve Junior

Compound Junior

References

 
Archery
Indoor